Anja Rugelj (born 25 June 1986) is a Slovenian professional racing cyclist.

See also
 List of 2015 UCI Women's Teams and riders

References

External links
 

1986 births
Living people
Slovenian female cyclists
Place of birth missing (living people)